The Montezuma Valley National Bank and Store Building, at 2-8 Main St. in Cortez, Colorado, was built in 1909.  It was listed on the National Register of Historic Places in 2009.

It was built by the Durango firm Stroehle & Lemmon, with stonework by local stonemason Peter Baxtrom and his son A.H. (Harry) Baxtrom.

Part or all of it has been known also as the Citizens State Bank, the Basin Industrial Bank, the Kermode Bakery and as Moffit Drug.

The listing included two contributing buildings.

References

		
National Register of Historic Places in Montezuma County, Colorado
Neoclassical architecture in Colorado
Commercial buildings completed in 1909